The following is a list of notable deaths in July 2015.

Entries for each day are listed alphabetically by surname. A typical entry lists information in the following sequence:
Name, age, country of citizenship and reason for notability, established cause of death, reference.

July 2015

1
Nasser al-Hafi, Egyptian lawyer and politician, MP (since 2012), shot.
Cecil, 13, Zimbabwean protected lion, shot.
David P. Craig, 95, Australian chemist.
Curly Moe, 53, Canadian professional wrestler, liver cancer.
Val Doonican, 88, Irish singer and television presenter.
N. Ganesan, 82, Singaporean football administrator.
Edward Greenfield, 86, English music critic and broadcaster.
Theo Hendriks, 86, Dutch politician, member of the House of Representatives (1994–1998).
Lawrence Herkimer, 89, American cheerleading innovator, heart failure.
Jens S. Jensen, 69, Swedish photographer.
Aleksandr Kochetkov, 81, Russian football player and coach.
Robert La Caze, 98, French-born Moroccan racing driver.
Red Lane, 76, American country singer and songwriter ("'Til I Get It Right"), cancer.
Mike Lesser, 71, British mathematical philosopher and political activist, asphyxiation.
Miloslava Misáková, 93, Czech Olympic gymnast (1948).
Shlomo Moussaieff, 90, Israeli diamond merchant and antique collector.
Hans Muller, 78, Dutch Olympic water polo player (1960, 1964).
Charles Notcutt, 81, British horticulturalist.
Czesław Olech, 84, Polish mathematician.
Overdose, 10, Hungarian Thoroughbred racehorse, horse colic.
Víctor de la Peña Pérez, 81, Spanish-born Peruvian Roman Catholic prelate, Vicar Apostolic of Requena (1987–2005).
Sergio Sollima, 94, Italian director and screenwriter (Face to Face, Sandokan, The Big Gundown).
Dan Williams, 73, American politician, member of the Alabama House of Representatives (since 2010), leukemia.
Sir Nicholas Winton, 106, British humanitarian, organised rescue of 669 children as part of Kindertransport, respiratory failure.
Russell Wood, 85, English cricketer (Gloucestershire).

2
David Aronson, 91, Lithuanian-born American painter, pneumonia and heart failure.
Slavko Avsenik, 85, Slovene composer and musician.
Roy C. Bennett, 96, American songwriter.
Jim Bradley, 94, Scottish-born Australian athletics coach.
Frank Callaway, 69, Australian judge.
Sir Ronald Davison, 94, New Zealand judge, Chief Justice (1978–1989).
Julius Duscha, 90, American journalist (The Washington Post).
Petro Korol, 74, Ukrainian Soviet weightlifter, Olympic champion (1976).
Tom Longo, 73, American football player (New York Giants), mesothelioma.
Charlie Sanders, 68, American Hall of Fame football player (Detroit Lions), cancer.
Bob Smalhout, 87, Dutch anesthesiologist and politician.
Waldo Vieira, 73, Brazilian spiritualist.
Jim Weaver, 70, American football player (Penn State) and coach (Iowa State), Virginia Tech Hokies Director of Athletics (1997–2014), Parkinson's disease.
John Whitman, 71, American businessman and investment banker, First Gentleman of New Jersey (1994–2001), complications from a brain injury.
Jacobo Zabludovsky, 87, Mexican news anchor, stroke.

3
Steven Benson, 63, American convicted murderer, stabbed.
Diana Douglas, 92, Bermudian-American actress (The Indian Fighter, Days of Our Lives, Planes, Trains and Automobiles), cancer.
Goran Gogić, 29, Serbian footballer.
Agop Jack Hacikyan, 83, Canadian author and academic.
Ralph Lamb, 88, American lawman, Sheriff of Clark County, Nevada (1961–1978), depicted in Vegas, complications from surgery.
Arturo Longton, 67, Chilean politician, Governor of Marga Marga Province (2010–2012).
Humphrey Mwanza, 66, Zambian politician, member of the National Assembly for Solwezi West (since 2006), complications from surgery.
Boyd K. Packer, 90, American apostle of the Church of Jesus Christ of Latter-day Saints, President of the Quorum of the Twelve (since 2008).
Amanda Peterson, 43, American actress (Can't Buy Me Love, Explorers), drug overdose.
Yogesh Kumar Sabharwal, 73, Indian judge, Chief Justice (2005–2007), heart attack.
Odd Seim-Haugen, 78, Norwegian barrister and sports official.
Jacques Sernas, 89, Lithuanian-born French actor (Helen of Troy, The Dirty Game, Midas Run).
Charanjit Singh, 75, Indian musician, cardiac arrest.
Gary Smith, 74, American business analyst, pneumonia.
György Szabad, 90, Hungarian politician and historian, Speaker of the National Assembly (1990–1994).
Wayne Townsend, 89, American politician, Indiana State Senator (1970–1986).
Phil Walsh, 55, Australian football player (Collingwood, Richmond, Brisbane Bears) and coach (Adelaide), stabbed.
John A. Williams, 89, American writer.
Franz-Josef Wolfframm, 80, German footballer.
Peter Záboji, 72, Hungarian angel investor and entrepreneur.

4
*Abdullah bin Abdulaziz bin Musa'ed bin Jiluwi Al Saud, 83–84, Saudi Arabian politician, Governor of Northern Borders Region.
*Muhammad Baqir al-Muhri, 67, Kuwaiti ayatollah.
Dave Barber, 60, American talk radio and television host, stroke and heart attack.
Nedelcho Beronov, 86, Bulgarian jurist and politician, Chairman of the Constitutional Court (2003–2006).
Scot Breithaupt, 57, American BMX cyclist.
Arnold Byfield, 91, Australian sportsman (Western Australia cricket team and Melbourne Football Club).
Luis Doldán, 77, Paraguayan footballer
Carlo de Gavardo, 45, Chilean rally car and motorcycle racer, respiratory failure.
William Conrad Gibbons, 88, American historian, complications of a stroke.
*Reynaldo González López, 66, Cuban sports administrator.
John Hinds, 35, Northern Irish motorcycle race doctor, injuries sustained in collision.
Norbert Peters, 72, German scientist.
Daniel Quinn, 58, American actor (The Young and the Restless), heart attack.
Valerio Ruggeri, 81, Italian actor and voice actor, heart attack.
Anthony F. Upton, 85, British historian.
Alan Walton, 79, British biochemist and venture capitalist.
Charles Winick, 92, American anthropologist, sociologist and author.
Yu Chenghui, 75, Chinese actor and martial artist.

5
Andrew Alexander, 80, British journalist.
James Bonard Fowler, 81, American policeman and convicted manslaughterer.
Sir Philip Goodhart, 89, British politician, MP for Beckenham (1957–1992).
Uffe Haagerup, 65, Danish mathematician, drowned.
Svein Hatløy, 75, Norwegian architect, founded Bergen School of Architecture.
Terence Kelshaw, 78, English-born American Episcopal prelate, Bishop of Rio Grande (1989–2004).
Hernus Kriel, 73, South African politician, Premier of the Western Cape (1994–1998), Minister of Law and Order (1991–1994).
Piet Malan, 96, South African rugby union player.
James S. Marcus, 85, American philanthropist and investment banker.
Joseph McKenzie, 86, Scottish photographer.
Aleksandra Mróz, 80, Polish Olympic swimmer.
Yoichiro Nambu, 94, Japanese-born American physicist, Nobel Prize laureate.
Burt Shavitz, 80, American beekeeper and businessman, co-founder of Burt's Bees.
Abderrahmane Soukhane, 78, Algerian football player.
Jack Steadman, 86, American football executive (Kansas City Chiefs).
Gordon Thompson Jr., 85, American judge, cancer.
Aaron E. Wasserman, 94, American food scientist.

6
Julio Angel, 69, Puerto Rican rock, pop and bolero singer, multiple myeloma.
Max Annett, 84, Australian Olympic rower.
Michael Birck, 77, American executive (Tellabs).
Camille Bob, 77, American rhythm and blues singer, cancer.
Stan Carew, 64, Canadian radio broadcaster, musician and actor (This Hour Has 22 Minutes, Trailer Park Boys).
Raymond Dean, 68, American psychologist.
Nazier Dindar, 49, South African cricketer.
Victor Warren Fazio, 75, Australian surgeon.
Ramanathan Gnanadesikan, 82, Indian statistician.
Anne Iversen, 91, Danish Olympic athlete.
Masabumi Kikuchi, 75, Japanese jazz pianist, subdural hematoma.
Sir John Lambert, 94, British diplomat, Ambassador to Tunisia (1977–1981).
Luigi Martella, 67, Italian Roman Catholic prelate, Bishop of Molfetta-Ruvo-Giovinazzo-Terlizzi (since 2000), heart attack.
John Maxtone-Graham, 85, American maritime historian, respiratory failure.
Rachel Margolis, 93, Lithuanian World War II partisan and Israeli biologist.
Bhattam Srirama Murthy, 89, Indian politician.
Don Petrie, 93, Canadian soccer player and coach.
Franco Scaglia, 71, Italian writer and journalist, won Campiello Prize (2002).
Fraser Scott, 95, British army officer.
Jerry Weintraub, 77, American film producer (Ocean's Eleven, Diner, The Karate Kid), chairman and CEO of United Artists, heart attack.

7
Maria Barroso, 90, Portuguese actress and politician, First Lady (1986–1996), complications from a fall.
Leonard Bodack, 82, American politician.
Keith Brown, 88, Canadian politician, member of the Legislative Assembly of Ontario (1959–1967).
Bako Dagnon, 67, Malian singer.
Jean Délémontez, 97, French aircraft designer (Jodel).
Carlos Echeverria, 85, American Olympic sailor.
Eva Fischer, 94, Italian artist.
Hamid Golpira, 55, American-born Iranian journalist, lung cancer.
Renée Hugon, 84, French gymnast.
Pierre MacDonald, 79, Canadian politician, member of the National Assembly of Quebec (1985–1989).
Bob MacKinnon, 87, American basketball coach (New Jersey Nets) and athletic director (Canisius Golden Griffins).
Jaime Morey, 73, Spanish singer ("Amanece").
Craig Norgate, 50, New Zealand businessman, CEO of Fonterra (2001–2003).
Fons van Wissen, 82, Dutch footballer (PSV Eindhoven, national team).
Donald Wood, 82, Canadian politician.

8
Hisato Aikura, 83, Japanese music critic.
Muhsin al-Fadhli, 34, Kuwaiti militant, airstrike.
Robert Campos, 75, Filipino actor, colorectal cancer.
Casimir Ehrnrooth, 84, Finnish executive, cardiac arrest.
Bill Foord, 91, English cricketer.
Daniel Kastler, 89, French theoretical physicist.
Irwin Keyes, 63, American actor (House of 1000 Corpses, The Jeffersons, The Flintstones), complications from acromegaly.
Arne Kotte, 80, Norwegian footballer.
Paul J. Lioy, 68, American environmental scientist.
Ernie Maresca, 76, American songwriter ("Runaround Sue", "The Wanderer") and singer.
Ramiro Martinez, 91, Cuban sportscaster.
Charles J. McCann, 89, American academic, president of The Evergreen State College.
Harry Messel, 93, Canadian-born Australian physicist.
Rolf Pettersson, 62, Swedish Olympic swimmer.
Lloyd Reckord, 86, Jamaican actor and director.
Philippe Rochat, 61, Swiss chef.
Frances Shea-Buckley, 86, American rear admiral, Director of the Navy Nurse Corps (1979–1983).
Lucita Soriano, 74, Filipino actress.
Ken Stabler, 69, American football player (Oakland Raiders), colon cancer.
Harry Stowers, 89, American judge, member of the New Mexico Supreme Court (1982–1989).
James Tate, 71, American Pulitzer Prize-winning poet.
Yoash Tzidon, 88, Romanian-born Israeli politician.
Walter Van Gerven, 80, Belgian law professor, Advocate General on the European Court of Justice (1988–1994).

9
Saud bin Faisal bin Abdulaziz Al Saud, 75, Saudi royal, Minister of Foreign Affairs (1975–2015).
Christian Audigier, 57, French fashion designer (Ed Hardy, Von Dutch), myelodysplastic syndrome.
Jim Bede, 82, American aircraft designer, aneurysm.
Caspar Bowden, 53, British privacy advocate, melanoma.
Seán Foran, 84, Irish Gaelic football player (Offaly).
Paul Gebhard, 98, American sexologist.
Bill Hunter, 95, British political activist and author.
C. Fred Jones, 85, American politician.
Michael Masser, 74, American songwriter ("Saving All My Love for You", "Theme from Mahogany (Do You Know Where You're Going To)"), complications from a stroke.
Bashar Nawaz, 79, Indian Urdu poet and songwriter.
Sriballav Panigrahi, 74, Indian politician, member of the Lok Sabha (1984–1989, 1991–1998).
David M. Raup, 82, American paleontologist, pneumonia.
Bent Rolstad, 68, Norwegian anatomist.
Tahsin Şahinkaya, 90, Turkish air force general, Commander (1978–1983).
R.J. Zwi Werblowsky, 90-91, Israeli religion scholar.

10
David Bowman, 82, American Episcopal prelate, Bishop of Western New York (1987–1998).
Woody Bowman, 73, American politician, member of the Illinois House of Representatives (1977–1990), traffic collision.
Sam Bulbulia, 82, South African cricketer.
Aldana Carraro, 20, Argentine gymnast.
Rosemary Dinnage, 87, British author and reviewer, cancer.
Hussein Fatal, 38, American rapper (Outlawz), traffic collision.
Peter Jones, 85, British journalist and author, heart failure.
Arthur Koning, 70, Dutch Olympic coxswain (1968).
Diarmuid Mac an Adhastair, 71, Irish actor (Ros na Rún).
Jimmy Murray, 82, Scottish footballer.
Leo Muthu, 63, Indian educationist and businessman.
Muhammad Abdul Qayyum Khan, 91, Pakistani politician, Prime Minister of Azad Jammu and Kashmir (1956–1957, 1970–1985, 1991–1996).
Roger Rees, 71, Welsh-American actor (Cheers, Robin Hood: Men in Tights, The West Wing), Tony winner (1982), stomach cancer.
Omar Sharif, 83, Egyptian actor (Lawrence of Arabia, Doctor Zhivago, Funny Girl), heart attack.
Jon Vickers, 88, Canadian heldentenor, Alzheimer's disease.
Grahame Vivian, 95, British army officer.

11
Claudia Alexander, 56, Canadian-born American geophysicist and planetary scientist (Jet Propulsion Laboratory), breast cancer.
Abu Khalil al-Madani, Saudi Al-Qaeda leader.
Stig Andersson, 90, Swedish Olympic cyclist.
Joyce M. Bennett, 92, English Anglican priest.
Giacomo Biffi, 87, Italian Roman Catholic cardinal, Archbishop of Bologna (1984–2003).
Mark Birdwood, 3rd Baron Birdwood, 76, British peer and politician.
Patricia Crone, 70, Danish-American historian and author (Hagarism), cancer.
James U. Cross, 90, American military pilot (Air Force One), aide and author.
Salvador Dubois Leiva, 79, Nicaraguan football player and coach.
Max Fischer, 88, German politician.
Alfred E. France, 88, American politician, member of the Minnesota House of Representatives (1963–1970), leukemia.
Đuka Galović, 91, Croatian folk musician.
Satoru Iwata, 55, Japanese game programmer (Super Smash Bros., Pokémon), president and CEO of Nintendo (since 2002), bile duct cancer.
Lawrence K. Karlton, 80, American federal judge, US District Court for Eastern California (1979–2015), complications from heart valve failure.
Richard F. Kelly, 78, American politician, member of the Illinois House of Representatives and Senate.
Peter de Klerk, 80, South African racing driver.
Roy Kurrasch, 92, American football player (Pittsburgh Steelers).
Consuelo Castillo de Sánchez Latour, 91, Guatemalan author.
André Leysen, 88, Belgian executive.
Paavo Lyytikäinen, 85, Finnish footballer.
Bunny Mack, 69, Sierra Leonean musician.
P. Chendur Pandian, 65, Indian politician, Tamil Nadu MLA for Kadayanallur (since 2011).
Ota Petřina, 66, Czech guitarist and songwriter.
Thomas Piccirilli, 50, American writer, brain cancer.
J.P.C. Roach, 95, British historian.
Bojan Udovič, 57, Slovene Yugoslav Olympic cyclist (1980), traffic collision.

12
D'Army Bailey, 73, American civil rights campaigner, judge and actor (The People vs. Larry Flynt), founder of the National Civil Rights Museum, cancer.
*Cheng Siwei, 80, Chinese economist, President of the China Democratic National Construction Association (1996–2007).
Omar Félix Colomé, 82, Argentinian Roman Catholic prelate, Bishop of Cruz del Eje (1984–2008).
JaJuan Dawson, 37, American football player (Cleveland Browns), drowned.
*Tenzin Delek Rinpoche, 65, Tibetan Buddhist monk and political prisoner, cardiac arrest from respiratory failure.
Mahlon Duckett, 92, American baseball player (Philadelphia Stars).
Helen F. Holt, 101, American politician, Secretary of State of West Virginia (1957–1959), member of the West Virginia House of Delegates (1955–1957), heart failure.
Chenjerai Hove, 59, Zimbabwean exiled author, journalist and poet, liver failure.
Javier Krahe, 71, Spanish singer-songwriter, heart attack.
Bosse Larsson, 81, Swedish television presenter (Allsång på Skansen), brain cancer.
Buddy Lively, 90, American baseball player (Cincinnati Reds).
Milorad Milutinović, 80, Serbian football player and manager (Neuchâtel Xamax).
Bafana Mlangeni, 48, South African actor.

13
Sir John Buchanan, 72, New Zealand natural resource executive, CFO of BP (1996–2002), Director of BHP Billiton (2003–2015), Chairman of ARM Holdings.
J. R. Gach, 63, American radio personality, diabetes.
Philipp Mißfelder, 35, German politician, member of the Bundestag (since 2005), pulmonary embolism.
Arturo Paoli, 102, Italian Roman Catholic priest and missionary.
Michael Rayner, 82, English opera singer.
Ildikó Schwarczenberger, 63, Hungarian fencer, Olympic champion (1976).
Joan Sebastian, 64, Mexican singer and songwriter, bone cancer.
Campbell Smith, 90, New Zealand artist, poet and playwright.
Martin Litchfield West, 77, British classical scholar.
Eric Wrixon, 68, Northern Irish keyboardist (Them, Thin Lizzy).
Gerhard Zwerenz, 90, German writer and politician, member of the Bundestag (1994–1998).

14
Willer Bordon, 66, Italian businessman and politician, Minister of the Environment (2000–2001).
Sir Sam Burston, 100, Australian farmer.
Yohanna Dickson, 64, Nigerian military officer, Governor of Taraba (1993–1997).
George Gardner Fagg, 81, American federal judge, United States Court of Appeals for the Eighth Circuit (1982–2006).
Wolf Gremm, 73, German film director and screenwriter, complications from cancer.
Gerd Gudding, 63, Norwegian musician.
Ismet Hadžić, 61, Bosnian footballer, cancer.
Masao Horiba, 90, Japanese businessman, founded Horiba.
Nobuo Mii, 84, Japanese computer executive (IBM).
Mansour Nariman, 80, Iranian oud player.
Olaf Pooley, 101, English actor (Doctor Who, Star Trek: Voyager, Sunday Night Theatre) and writer.
Marlene Sanders, 84, American television news executive (ABC World News Tonight, CBS News) and journalist, cancer.
Alby Schultz, 76, Australian politician, NSW MP for Burrinjuck (1988–1998), federal MP for Hume (1998–2013), cancer.
Dave Somerville, 81, Canadian-American singer (The Diamonds), pancreatic cancer.
M. S. Viswanathan, 87, Indian music composer and film scorer.

15
Jacques Allard, 89, French Olympic sailor.
Masahiko Aoki, 77, Japanese economist, lung disorder.
Phil Cayzer, 93, Australian rower.
Federico Cerruti, 93, Italian art collector.
Alan Curtis, 80, American harpsichordist, conductor and scholar.
Alexis FitzGerald Jnr, 70, Irish politician, member of the Seanad Éireann (1982–1987) and Teachta Dála (1982), Lord Mayor of Dublin (1981–1982).
Aubrey Morris, 89, British actor (A Clockwork Orange, Love and Death, The Wicker Man).
Oswald Probst, 80, Austrian Olympic archer.
Sheila Ramani, 83, Indian actress, complications from Alzheimer's disease.
Howard Rumsey, 97, American modern jazz double bassist, bandleader and nightclub owner.
*Wan Li, 98, Chinese politician, Chairman of the National People's Congress (1988–1993).
Jacques Thébault, 91, French actor.
Fred Wendorf, 90, American archaeologist.
Rogi Wieg, 52, Dutch writer and musician, euthanasia.

16
Denis Avey, 96, British World War II veteran and memoirist.
Joseph Caprani, 95, Irish cricket player and umpire.
Paul Chervet, 73, Swiss Olympic boxer.
Evelyn Ebsworth, 82, British chemist and university administrator, Vice-Chancellor and Warden of Durham University (1990–1998).
Alcides Ghiggia, 88, Uruguayan-Italian football player and manager (Peñarol), heart attack.
John H. Gibbons, 86, American scientist, Director of the Office of Science and Technology Policy (1993–1998).
Sir Jack Goody, 95, British social anthropologist.
Raymond Goussot, 93, French cyclist.
Brian Hall, 68, Scottish footballer (Liverpool), leukaemia.
Alan Kupperberg, 62, American comic book artist (The Amazing Spider-Man, Thor, Iron Man), thymus cancer.
Jean Lacouture, 94, French journalist and historian.
Jim Mayne, 64, Canadian politician, leader of Prince Edward Island New Democratic Party (1983–1989).
V. Ramakrishna, 67, Indian playback singer and film scorer, cancer.
Moreshwar Save, 85, Indian politician, MP for Aurangabad (1989–1996).
Veikko Savela, 96, Finnish politician.
Pranciškus Tupikas, 86, Lithuanian politician.
W. Wilbert Welch, 97, American theologian.
Milton L. Wood, 92, American Episcopal prelate, Bishop Suffragan of Atlanta (1967–1974).

17
Andal Ampatuan, Sr., 74, Filipino politician, Governor of Maguindanao, suspect in the Maguindanao massacre, heart attack.
Bill Arnsparger, 88, American football coach (New York Giants, LSU Tigers) and athletic director (University of Florida), heart attack.
Jules Bianchi, 25, French Formula One driver, head injuries sustained in a race collision.
Owen Chadwick, 99, British historian, theologian, and rugby player.
Murray Feingold, 84, American physician and medical journalist.
Francis P. Filice, 92, American priest and academic.
Don Fontana, 84, Canadian tennis player.
Duff Holbrook, 92, American biologist and outdoorsman, designer of rocket net for use in hunting.
Ray Jessel, 85, Welsh scriptwriter and songwriter (Baker Street).
William C. Kuebler, 44, American military officer, appointed lawyer for Omar Khadr, cancer.
John McCluskey, 71, Scottish Olympic boxer (1964).
Van Miller, 87, American football announcer (Buffalo Bills).
James Nyondo, 47, Malawian politician, lung cancer.
Susumu Okubo, 85, Japanese theoretical physicist.
Nova Pilbeam, 95, British actress (The Man Who Knew Too Much, Young and Innocent, Tudor Rose).
Dagmar Sierck, 57, German Olympic swimmer.
John Taylor, 72, British jazz pianist, heart attack.
Dick van Bekkum, 89, Dutch radiobiologist.

18
Tim Beaglehole, 82, New Zealand historian and educator, chancellor of Victoria University, pneumonia.
Sushil Bhattacharya, 90, Indian football player, men's (East Bengal) and women's (national team) coach.
Ron Bissett, 83, Canadian Olympic basketball player.
Elmer Borstad, 90, Canadian politician.
Buddy Buie, 74, American songwriter ("Spooky", "Traces"), heart attack.
George Coe, 86, American actor (Archer, Kramer vs. Kramer, The Mighty Ducks).
Neal Falls, 45, American murder suspect, shot.
Lou Gardiner, 62, New Zealand military officer, Chief of the Army (2003–2006), cancer.
Priscilla Kincaid-Smith, 88, South African-Australian nephrologist, discovered the link between phenacetin and kidney cancer.
Athanasios Moulakis, 70, Greek historian and political scientist.
Alex Rocco, 79, American actor (The Godfather, The George Carlin Show, The Facts of Life), Emmy winner (1990), pancreatic cancer.
Hugh Stretton, 91, Australian historian.
Per Tønder, 104, Norwegian politician.
*Wang Fuzhou, 80, Chinese mountain climber.
Allan Willett, 78, British soldier and businessman, Lord-Lieutenant of Kent (2002–2011).
Brock Winkless, 55, American puppeteer and visual effects technician (Child's Play, Tales from the Crypt, Terminator 2: Judgment Day); multiple sclerosis.
*Yang Ko-han, 27, Taiwanese actress, suicide by hanging.

19
Van Alexander, 100, American big band leader, songwriter-arranger ("A-Tisket, A-Tasket"), film and television composer (I Dream of Jeannie, Bewitched), heart failure.
Rugger Ardizoia, 95, Italian baseball player (New York Yankees), stroke.
Stellan Bojerud, 70, Swedish politician, MP for Dalarna (2012–2015).
Douglas S. Cook, 56, American screenwriter (The Rock, Double Jeopardy).
Elio Fiorucci, 80, Italian fashion designer.
Josh Greenberg, 28, American technology executive, co-founder of Grooveshark.
Lalubha Jadeja, 92, Indian cricketer.
Bernat Martínez, 35, Spanish motorcycle racer, race collision.
Richard Ochoa, 31, Venezuelan cyclist, motorcycle collision.
Bryan O'Linn, 87, South African-born Namibian jurist and human rights advocate, member of the High Court (1989–1999) and Supreme Court (1999–2006).
Sybren Polet, 91, Dutch writer.
Galina Prozumenshchikova, 66, Russian Soviet-era swimmer, Olympic champion (1964).
Carmino Ravosa, 85, American composer and lyricist.
Dani Rivas, 27, Spanish motorcycle racer, race collision.
David Roth, 56, American opera director and manager
Gennadiy Seleznyov, 67, Russian politician, Speaker of the Duma (1996–2003).
Mildred Joanne Smith, 94, American actress (No Way Out) and educator, survivor of National Airlines Flight 101 crash.
Václav Snítil, 87, Czech violinist and teacher.

20
Jean Alfred, 75, Canadian politician.
George Bon Salle, 80, American basketball player.
Wayne Carson, 72, American songwriter ("The Letter", "Always on My Mind", "Neon Rainbow").
Fred Else, 82, English footballer (Preston North End).
Ron Fitch, 105, Australian railway historian.
Inge Glashörster, 88, German Olympic sprinter.
Sally Gross, 81, American dancer and choreographer, ovarian cancer.
Des Horne, 75, South African footballer (Blackpool).
Kafumba Konneh, 71, Liberian Islamic cleric, peace activist and public servant, commissioner of the Truth and Reconciliation Commission.
Dieter Moebius, 71, Swiss-German electronic musician (Cluster, Harmonia, Moebius & Plank), cancer.
Tom Moore, 86, American cartoonist (Archie), throat cancer.
Sieghardt Rupp, 84, Austrian actor.
Raymond Stora, 84, French theoretical physicist.
Shunsuke Tsurumi, 93, Japanese philosopher and anti-war activist, pneumonia.
Giorgos Velentzas, 87, Greek actor.
Colin Youren, 76, Australian football player (Hawthorn), cancer.

21
Mitch Aliotta, 71, American musician (Rotary Connection, Aliotta Haynes Jeremiah), chronic obstructive pulmonary disease.
Gigi Angelillo, 75, Italian actor and voice actor.
Theodore Bikel, 91, Austrian-born American actor (The Defiant Ones, My Fair Lady, Fiddler on the Roof), folk singer and composer.
Robert Broberg, 75, Swedish singer and songwriter, Parkinson's disease.
Luiz Paulo Conde, 80, Brazilian politician and architect, Mayor of Rio de Janeiro (1997–2001).
Charlie Cullinane, 72, Irish hurler (Cork).
William R. Dickinson, 83, American geoscientist, member of the National Academy of Sciences.
E. L. Doctorow, 84, American author (Ragtime, Billy Bathgate, The March), complications from lung cancer.
Buddy Emmons, 78, American steel guitarist.
Paul Freeman, 79, American music conductor, founder of Chicago Sinfonietta.
Günter Fronius, 107, Austrian entrepreneur.
Gelsen Gas, 82, Mexican artist and filmmaker.
Nicholas Gonzalez, 67, American physician known for alternative cancer treatments.
Ho Sheng-lung, 62, Taiwanese politician, MLY (1998–1999), liver cancer.
T. Kanakam, 88, Indian actress.
Kang Nung-su, 85, North Korean politician.
Alfredo Lardelli, 59, Swiss murderer and businessman, multiple organ failure.
Czesław Marchaj, 97, Polish yachtsman and professor.
Ernie McCullough, 89, Canadian Olympic sprinter.
Anthony Megale, 61, American mobster.
Mariam Mfaki, 69, Tanzanian politician, MP for Dodoma (since 2000), lung cancer.
Dick Nanninga, 66, Dutch footballer (Roda JC Kerkrade, national team), complications from diabetes.
Serhiy Omelyanovych, 37, Ukrainian footballer (Charleroi).
Don Randall, 62, Australian politician, MP for Swan (1996–1998) and Canning (since 2001), suspected heart attack.
Olav Riste, 82, Norwegian historian.
James F. Rothenberg, 69, American financial executive, chairman of the Capital Group, heart attack.
Mike Turner, 80, English cricketer (Leicestershire).

22
Barbara Calvert, 89, British barrister.
Herschal Crow, 80, American politician, member of the Oklahoma Senate (1969–1982) and Secretary of Transportation (2001–2003), complications following hip surgery.
Denny Ebbers, 41, Dutch Olympic judoka (1996), brain tumor.
Christopher M. Fairman, 54, American legal scholar (Fuck: Word Taboo and Protecting Our First Amendment Liberties), cardiac arrest.
Eddie Hardin, 66, British rock musician (Spencer Davis Group) and singer-songwriter, heart attack.
Marilyn C. Jones, 88, American baseball player (AAGBPL).
Don Joyce, 71, American musician (Negativland) and radio personality (Over the Edge), heart failure.
Frank Narvo, 82, Australian rugby league player (Newtown Jets).
Daron Norwood, 49, American country music singer.
Roble Olhaye, 71, Djiboutian diplomat, Ambassador to the United States (since 1988), Dean of the Diplomatic Corps of Washington, D.C.
Natasha Parry, 84, British actress (Romeo and Juliet, Oh! What a Lovely War, Meetings with Remarkable Men), stroke.
Simon-Pierre Saint-Hillien, 64, Haitian Roman Catholic prelate, Bishop of Hinche (since 2009).
Josef Scheungraber, 97, German World War II army officer and convicted war criminal.
Hoza'a Sherif, 54, Lebanese diplomat, Ambassador to Iraq (since 2006), cancer.
Martin Storey, British Channel Islander politician, member of the States (since 2008), cancer.
Gordon Stuart, 91, Canadian-born Welsh portrait artist.
Horst Walter, 76, German footballer (Dynamo Dresden).

23
William Wakefield Baum, 88, American Roman Catholic prelate, Archbishop of Washington (1973–1980), Cardinal (1976–2015).
Mladen Dražetin, 64, Serbian academic and poet.
Francis Guess, 69, American civil rights advocate and public servant, member of the U. S. Civil Rights Commission (1983–1989).
Jon the Postman, 59, English punk rock singer, burst heart valve.
Shigeko Kubota, 77, Japanese artist, cancer.
Mexicano 777, 43, Puerto Rican rapper, tongue and throat cancer.
Don Oberdorfer, 84, American journalist and author, Alzheimer's disease.
Rasoul Raeisi, 90, Iranian Olympic weightlifter (1948).
José Sazatornil, 89, Spanish actor.
Aung Thaung, 74, Burmese politician and businessman, member of the Pyithu Hluttaw for Taungtha Township (since 2011).
Cirilo Vila, 77, Chilean composer, heart attack.
James L. White, 67, American screenwriter (Ray), complications from pancreatic cancer.

24
Irv Bauer, 82, American playwright and screenwriter.
Corsino Fortes, 82, Cape Verdean writer, poet and diplomat, Ambassador to Portugal (1975–1981).
Peg Lynch, 98, American comedy writer and actress (Ethel and Albert).
Florenz Regalado, 86, Filipino Supreme Court judge.
Jürgen Rohwer, 91, German naval historian.
Mario Sereni, 87, Italian operatic baritone.
Ingrid Sischy, 63, South African magazine editor and critic, breast cancer.
Dale Sturtz, 77, American politician, member of the Indiana House of Representatives (1992–2002).

25
Jacques Andreani, 85, French diplomat.
Kalpataru Das, 64, Indian politician, member of the Rajya Sabha (since 2014), Odisha MLA for Dharmasala (1995–2014), cancer.
R. S. Gavai, 85, Indian politician, Governor of Bihar (2006–2008), Kerala (2008–2011), member of the Rajya Sabha (2000–2006), MP for Amravati (1998).
Silan Kadirgamar, 81, Sri Lankan academic.
Bob Kauffman, 69, American basketball player (Seattle SuperSonics, Buffalo Braves) and coach (Detroit Pistons).
Larbi Messari, 79, Moroccan politician and diplomat, Minister of Communications (1998–2000), Ambassador to Brazil (1985–1991).
Robin Phillips, 73, British-born Canadian actor and director (Long Day's Journey into Night, Jekyll & Hyde, The Marriage of Figaro), artistic director of Stratford Festival (1975–1980).
Scott Sims, 59, American veterinarian and television personality (Aloha Vet), bladder cancer.
Joseph Skerrett, 72, American literary critic.
Nilo Zandanel, 77, Italian Olympic ski jumper.

26
Abu Zant, 60–61, Jordanian Muslim scholar and politician, member of the House of Representatives (1989–1997).
Richard Bass, 85, American ski executive and mountaineer, co-founder of Snowbird Ski Resort, first person to climb the Seven Summits, pulmonary fibrosis.
Bobbi Kristina Brown, 22, American media personality and singer, water immersion and drug intoxication.
Peter Ehrlich, 82, German actor.
Peggy Evans, 94, British actress (The Blue Lamp).
Vic Firth, 85, American musician and percussion mallet manufacturer, pancreatic cancer.
Benita Gil, 102, Spanish teacher and exiled, Order of Isabella the Catholic (2014).
Wolfgang Gönnenwein, 82, German conductor and music director, director of Staatstheater Stuttgart (1985–1992).
Bijoy Krishna Handique, 80, Indian politician, MP for Jorhat (1991–2014), Rajya Sabha (1980–1986), Assam MLA for Jorhat (1971–1980).
Lee Harwood, 76, British poet.
Han Heijenbrock, 85, Dutch Olympic rower.
Junichi Komori, 74, Japanese billiards player, cancer.
Mike Kostiuk, 95, Canadian-born American football player (Cleveland Rams, Detroit Lions), heart failure.
Jeffrey S. Lyons, 75, Canadian lawyer, lobbyist and business executive, heart attack.
Flora MacDonald, 89, Canadian politician, Secretary of State for External Affairs (1979–1980), MP for Kingston and the Islands (1972–1988).
Robert Mosher, 94, American architect (San Diego–Coronado Bridge).
Lerryn Mutton, 90, Australian politician, member of the New South Wales Legislative Assembly for Yaralla (1968–1978).
Vasili Pichul, 54, Ukrainian-born Russian film director (Little Vera).
Leo Reise Jr., 93, Canadian ice hockey player (Detroit Red Wings), lung cancer.
Ann Rule, 83, American true crime author (The Stranger Beside Me), heart failure.
Pía Sebastiani, 90, Argentine pianist and composer.
Richard Smith, 80, Australian diplomat.
Sebastiano Vassalli, 73, Italian novelist.
Joe Williams, 56, American film critic (St. Louis Post-Dispatch), traffic collision.

27
Tom Boyd, 86, American politician, member of the Idaho House of Representatives (1977–1992).
Edward Campbell, 71, English rugby league player.
J. W. S. Cassels, 93, British mathematician, fall.
Rickey Grundy, 56, American gospel musician.
A. P. J. Abdul Kalam, 83, Indian scientist and politician, President of India (2002–2007), heart attack.
Paul Langford, 69, British historian, Rector of Lincoln College, Oxford (2000–2012).
Chris Lazari, 69, Cypriot-born British property developer, heart attack.
Ivan Moravec, 84, Czech concert pianist.
Clyde M. Narramore, 98, American author and psychologist.
Rafael Navarro Núñez, 69, Spanish painter.
Samuel Pisar, 86, Polish-born American lawyer, writer and Holocaust survivor, pneumonia.
Alina Rodríguez, 63, Cuban actress, cancer.
Anthony Shaw, 85, British army general, Director General Army Medical Services (1988–1990).
Tony Vogel, 73, British actor (Raiders of the Lost Ark, Mission: Impossible, Miracle).

28
James H. Allen, 87, American clown and children's television personality, heart failure.
Diego Barisone, 26, Argentine footballer (Unión de Santa Fe), traffic collision.
Claude M. Bolton Jr., 69, American army general.
David Faber, 86, Polish-born Holocaust survivor and author (Because of Romek).
Rip Hawkins, 76, American football player (Minnesota Vikings), Lewy body dementia.
John M. Hull, 80, British theologian.
Barry Hunter, 87, Australian Anglican prelate, Bishop of Riverina (1971–1992).
James Jude, 87, American thoracic surgeon, developer of CPR, neurological disorder.
Carolyn Kaelin, 54, American cancer surgeon, cancer.
Jan Kulczyk, 65, Polish businessman (Kulczyk Investments), wealthiest person in Poland, complications of heart surgery.
David Leaning, 78, British Anglican priest.
Edward Natapei, 61, Ni-Vanuatu politician, President (1999), Prime Minister (2001–2004, 2008–2009, 2009–2010, 2011), MP (1983–2008).
Olubuse II, 85, Nigerian traditional ruler of Ife.
Fred Otnes, 89, American artist.
Josef Pecanka, 90, Austrian field hockey player, football player and coach.
Franciscus Xaverius Rocharjanta Prajasuta, 83, Indonesian Roman Catholic prelate, Bishop of Banjarmasin (1983–2008), kidney failure.
Clive Rice, 66, South African cricketer, brain tumour.
Shawn Robinson, 41, American stunt performer (Guardians of the Galaxy, Transformers, Hook).
Suniti Solomon, 76, Indian doctor and AIDS researcher.
Jack Boynton Strong, 85, American politician, member of the Texas Senate (1963–1971), Alzheimer's disease.

29
Giorgio Albani, 86, Italian cyclist.
Harry B. Brock Jr., 90, American banker.
Antony Holland, 95, British-born Canadian actor, playwright, and theatre director.
Malik Ishaq, 55–56, Pakistani Lashkar-e-Jhangvi leader, shot.
Vasundhara Komkali, 84, Indian classical musician.
Sir Peter O'Sullevan, 97, Irish-born British horse racing commentator, cancer.
Charles Pous, 66, French Olympic hockey player.
Mike Pyle, 76, American football player (Chicago Bears), 1963 NFL Champion, brain hemorrhage.
Jemera Rone, 71, American human rights activist, ovarian cancer.
Liya Shakirova, 94, Soviet and Russian linguist.
Peter Sim, 98, Australian politician, Senator for Western Australia (1964–1981).
Tamarillo, 23, British eventing horse, euthanised. (death announced on this date)
Sir John Todd, 88, New Zealand businessman (Todd Corporation) and philanthropist.
Alfredo Vernacotola, 37, Italian poet.
Franklin H. Westervelt, 85, American computer scientist.

30
Oleg Alekseev, 62, Russian Soviet wrestler.
Lynn Anderson, 67, American country singer ("Rose Garden"), heart attack.
Stuart Baggs, 27, English entrepreneur and The Apprentice candidate.
John Bitove, Sr., 87, Canadian businessman.
Louise Crossley, 72–73, Australian environmentalist and scientist.
Clifford Earl, 81, British actor (Doctor Who, The Sea Wolves).
Harry Gast, 94, American politician, member of the Michigan Senate (1979–2002).
Kenneth Irby, 78, American poet.
Endel Lippmaa, 84, Estonian scientist and politician.
Yakub Memon, 53, Indian terrorist and chartered accountant, convicted of financing the 1993 Bombay bombings, execution by hanging.
Francis Paul Prucha, 94, American historian.
Louis Sokoloff, 93, American neuroscientist.
Alena Vrzáňová, 84, Czech figure skater, World Champion (1949, 1950) and European Champion (1950).
John Weinert, 83, American college basketball coach (Bowling Green Falcons).
Ernst K. Zinner, 78, Austrian-born American astrophysicist.

31
Charles P. Bowers, 86, American baseball scout (Boston Red Sox, Los Angeles Dodgers, Philadelphia Phillies), Parkinson's disease.
Curtis Brown, 60, American football player (Buffalo Bills), heart attack.
Alan Cheuse, 75, American writer and critic, traffic collision.
Ruud Sesink Clee, 84, Dutch rower.
Coralie de Burgh, 90, British painter.
Rubén Espinosa, 31, Mexican photographer and journalist. murdered.
Robert Hemenway, 73, American educator, Chancellor of the University of Kansas (1995–2009).
Howard W. Jones, 104, American physician, IVF pioneer, respiratory failure.
Takeshi Katō, 86, Japanese actor (Ran).
Gerald S. O'Loughlin, 93, American actor (The Rookies, In Cold Blood, Ice Station Zebra).
Sasi Perumal, 59, Indian Gandhian and anti-alcohol activist.
Billy Pierce, 88, American baseball player (Chicago White Sox, Detroit Tigers, San Francisco Giants), gallbladder cancer.
Roddy Piper, 61, Canadian professional wrestler (WWE, NWA, WCW) and actor (They Live, Hell Comes to Frogtown, Body Slam), complications from hypertension.
Red Dragon, 49, Jamaican reggae singer.
Richard Schweiker, 89, American politician, Secretary of HHS (1981–1983), Senator from Pennsylvania (1969–1981), U.S. Representative from Penn 13th district (1961–1969), infection.
László Sinkó, 75, Hungarian actor.
Derek Turner, 82, English rugby league player (Wakefield Trinity).
W. Eugene Wilson, 86, American politician.
Zhang Jingfu, 101, Chinese politician, Finance Minister (1975–1979), State Councilor (1978–1988).

References

2015-07
 07